The Liberal Party (Portuguese: Partido Liberal) was a Brazilian political party of the imperial period, which was formed c. 1831 and ended with the proclamation of the Republic in 1889.

References 

Liberal parties in Brazil
Defunct political parties in Brazil
Political parties disestablished in 1889
1889 disestablishments in Brazil

External Links